Francisco Pavón Barahona (born 9 January 1980) is a Spanish former footballer who played as a centre-back.

His name became associated with the Los Galácticos policy when Real Madrid – where he spent most of his professional career – president Florentino Pérez promised to build a team full of Zidanes and Pavones – expensive high-profile recruits like Zinedine Zidane and youth team graduates like Pavón.

Over nine seasons, Pavón amassed La Liga totals of 125 matches and three goals, with his main club and Zaragoza.

Club career

Born in Madrid, Pavón progressed through the ranks at Real Madrid, starting with the junior team Tendillo until he established himself with the reserves. He made his La Liga debut against Athletic Bilbao at the Santiago Bernabéu Stadium on 6 October 2001 and, shortly after that 2–0 win, signed a seven-year professional contract. He went on to make a further 27 league appearances during the season, adding that campaign's UEFA Champions League.

Pavón totalled 51 league matches in the next two years, scoring a rare goal on 8 May 2004 in a 2–3 home loss to RCD Mallorca. His role would diminish drastically onwards, as he made no league appearances during 2006–07.

On 25 April 2007, media speculation indicated that Pavón was close to agreeing a four-year deal with Premier League club Bolton Wanderers, rejoining former teammate Iván Campo, but nothing came of it. He eventually put pen to paper a four-year contract with Real Zaragoza in July after his release from Real Madrid, but took part in just eight league games through the season as the Aragonese were relegated.

In 2008–09's Segunda División, Pavón netted his first goal for Zaragoza, in a 2–1 home victory over Real Murcia who had also been relegated the previous campaign. He contributed much more consistently as they were immediately promoted.

Pavón was only third or fourth-choice centre-back in the 2009–10 season, but still managed to score twice as Zaragoza retained their status in the division. He signed for AC Arles-Avignon on the last day of the 2010 summer transfer window, reuniting with former Real Madrid teammate Álvaro Mejía.

In November 2011, Pavón went on trial with West Ham United of the Football League Championship, but failed to convince manager Sam Allardyce of his fitness. After nearly two years without a club – during which he refused to claim unemployment benefits, saying "others need it more"– he chose to retire, aged 33.

Career statistics
Source:

Honours
Real Madrid
La Liga: 2002–03, 2006–07
Supercopa de España: 2001, 2003
UEFA Champions League: 2001–02
Intercontinental Cup: 2002
UEFA Super Cup: 2002

References

External links

1980 births
Living people
Spanish footballers
Footballers from Madrid
Association football defenders
La Liga players
Segunda División players
Segunda División B players
Tercera División players
Real Madrid C footballers
Real Madrid Castilla footballers
Real Madrid CF players
Real Zaragoza players
Ligue 1 players
AC Arlésien players
UEFA Champions League winning players
Spanish expatriate footballers
Expatriate footballers in France
Spanish expatriate sportspeople in France